La Luz is a census-designated place in Otero County, New Mexico, United States.

La Luz may also refer to:

La Luz, Cuba, a small town in Cuba
La Luz F.C., a football team in Uruguay
La Luz–La Paz, a Málaga Metro station

Music 
La Luz (band), a Los Angeles-based surf rock band
"La Luz" (Juanes song), 2013
"La Luz (Fin)", a song by Kali Uchis and Jhay Cortez from Sin Miedo (del Amor y Otros Demonios)
"La Luz" (Thalía and Myke Towers song), 2020
La Luz, EP by Christina Aguilera, from her Spanish-language ninth studio album, Aguilera (2022)

See also 
 Luz (disambiguation)